Oldbury United Football Club is a football club representing Oldbury, West Midlands, England.

History
Oldbury United FC was formed in 1958 under the name of Queens Colts and played in the local Oldbury League. Queens Colts won the Oldbury League Division Two title in 1961-62 and subsequently changed their name to Whiteheath United, playing in the Warwickshire and West Midlands Alliance from 1962 to 1965. The club amalgamated with Oldbury Town in 1965; taking the name Oldbury United and joined the Worcestershire Combination (later Midland Football Combination) in 1966.

In 1973 the club acquired an old quarry off York Road and set about laying the pitch and building facilities. Floodlights were installed in 1982, commemorated with a visit by newly crowned European champions Aston Villa.

The club were league runners-up twice in the late 1970s and in 1982, despite only finishing fifth in the league, stepped up to the Southern League Midland Division.

In 1985–86 United finished bottom of the league and switched to the West Midlands (Regional) League where they enjoyed a number of successful seasons, including winning the championship in 1993. Based on this, in 1994 they became founder members of the Midland Alliance, where they have played ever since, with a best finish of third place.

Due to an ongoing legal dispute, Oldbury United began the 2008–09 season sharing The Beeches, home ground of Tividale. The legal dispute ended in the club folding at the end of the season. In 2017 the club was reformed, joining Division Two of the West Midlands (Regional) League.

Honours
West Midlands (Regional) League
Champions 1992–93
Runners-up 1986–87, 1987–88
Midland Combination
Runners-up 1971–72, 1978–79
Walsall Senior Cup
Winners 1983
Staffordshire Senior Cup
Winners 1998
Midland Alliance League Cup
Winners 1999

Club records
Best League performance: 6th in Southern League Midland Division, 1982–83
Best FA Cup performance: 4th qualifying round, 1986–87
Best FA Trophy performance: 3rd qualifying round, 1984–85
Best FA Vase performance: 5th round, 1977–78

References

External links
Pyramid Passion feature on their ground

Football clubs in England
Midland Football Alliance
Association football clubs established in 1958
Association football clubs disestablished in 2009
Sport in Sandwell
Southern Football League clubs
Oldbury, West Midlands
1958 establishments in England
2009 disestablishments in England